Dunya Maumoon (born 20 March 1970) is a former Minister of Foreign Affairs (2013–2016) of the Government of Maldives.

Personal life

Dunya Maumoon was the Minister of Foreign Affairs of Maldives from 2013- 2016.  She is he eldest daughter of former Maldives president Maumoon Abdul Gayoom.

Minister for Foreign Affairs (Nov 2013 – July 2016) 
Maumoon served as the Foreign Minister of the Maldives from November 2013 until July 2016. Maumoon was the first female Foreign Minister of the Maldives.

Maumoon played a key role in establishing and re‐energising close ties with traditional friends such as India, Sri Lanka and Pakistan.

Maumoon provided leadership for the Maldivians in its second term serving on the UN's Human Rights Council.

Deputy Minister and Minister of State for Foreign Affairs 
After her tenure with the UNFPA, in January 2007, Maumoon took up the position of Deputy Minister at the Ministry of Foreign Affairs.  Maumoon was appointed Minister of State for Foreign Affairs, by President Dr. Mohamed Waheed Hassan, in February 2012.

Political career 
From 2009 to 2012, Maumoon was involved in both DRP and later in the Progressive Party of Maldives (PPM) as Council Member and had a  role in the Women's Movements.

United Nations involvement 
Maumoon began her professional career at the United Nations Population Fund (UNFPA) in the Maldives in 1998.

Education 
She obtained a B.A.(Honors) degree in Social Anthropology at the University of Cambridge in England in 1992. She went on to complete a MPhil Degree at the London School of Economic & Political Science (LSE) in 1996, where the focus of her research was “Gender Activism & the Islamic Revival”.

References

1970 births
Living people
Foreign Ministers of the Maldives
Alumni of the London School of Economics
Children of national leaders
Female foreign ministers
21st-century Maldivian women politicians
21st-century Maldivian politicians
Women government ministers of the Maldives
Maldivian women diplomats
20th-century Maldivian women